David Gregg Wilson is a British screenwriter and assistant producer for the James Bond movie series and an executive producer of the James Bond video games.

Background
David G. Wilson, the son of Michael G. Wilson, is head of Creative & Business Affairs for Eon Screenwriters Workshop Ltd, as well as Vice-president of Global Business Strategy for Eon Productions. He is also CEO of Shared Experience Art Machine Ltd.

He has worked in feature film production since 1992 on 11 films, starting out as an assistant director on Japanese low- and medium-budget features in Tokyo, where he worked with director Shohei Imamura. He has worked on five James Bond movies, including as script editor on Quantum of Solace and assistant producer on Casino Royale.

James Bond franchise
VP Global Business Strategy for Eon Productions.

Assistant Director, GoldenEye

Assistant Producer for Michael G. Wilson and Barbara Broccoli
Casino Royale (2006)

Video games
Executive Producer, GoldenEye 007

Executive Producer, GoldenEye Reloaded

Executive Producer, James Bond 007: Blood Stone

Executive Producer, 007 Legends

References

External links

British film producers
English theatre managers and producers
Place of birth missing (living people)
Year of birth missing (living people)
Living people
James Bond